Wheelchair basketball event at the 2015 Parapan American Games was played from 8 to 15 August 2015 at the Ryerson Athletic Centre. It served as the qualifier for the 2016 Summer Paralympics.

Participating nations

Men's tournament

Women's tournament

Medal summary

Medal table

Medalists

References

External links
 Basketball results

Events at the 2015 Parapan American Games